The Bruce Lee Library is composed of books written by or about Bruce Lee (1940-1973), famous Hongkongese and American martial artist, philosopher, author, instructor of martial arts, actor, filmmaker and screenwriter.

Books authored
 Chinese Gung Fu: The Philosophical Art of Self-Defense (Bruce Lee's first book) – 1963
Read 1963 book online 
 Tao of Jeet Kune Do (published posthumously) – 1973
 Read 1973 book online
 Bruce Lee's Fighting Method (published posthumously) – 1978
Read 1978 book online

Volumes in the series

The editor commissioned by Bruce Lee's estate for this series was John Little.

Vol. 1: Words of the Dragon — Interviews, 1958–1973 
Vol. 2:  The Tao of Gung Fu —  A Study in the Way of Chinese Martial Arts 
Vol. 3: Jeet Kune Do — Bruce Lee's Commentaries on the Martial Way 
Vol. 4: The Art of Expressing the Human Body 
Vol. 5: Letters of the Dragon — Correspondence, 1958–73 
Vol. 6: Artist of Life 
Vol. 7: Striking Thoughts — Bruce Lee's Wisdom for Daily Living 
Vol. 8: The Celebrated Life of the Golden Dragon 

Tuttle Publishing is the official publisher of this series.

Biographies
Bruce Lee: A Life, by Matthew Polly
The Life and Tragic Death of Bruce Lee, by Linda Lee Cadwell (published in the United States as Bruce Lee: The Man Only I Knew)
The Warrior Within, by John Little
Beyond Bruce Lee, by Paul Bowman
Striking Distance, by Charles Russo

List of books about Bruce Lee
 Assli,  Salem (2002). Jeet Kune Do 'Toutes les techniques de Bruce Lee'. Editions Chiron. . 
 Balicki, Ron; Steve Gold (2001). Jeet Kune Do: The Principles of a Complete Fighter. HNL Publishing. . 
 Baker, Tim (2019). The Bruce Lee Way: Motivation, Wisdom and Life-Lessons from the Legend. Media Lab Books. . 
 Beasley, Jerry (2001). The Jeet Kune Do Experience: Understanding Bruce Lee's Ultimate Martial Art. Paladin Press. . 
 Bishop, James (2004). Bruce Lee: Dynamic Becoming. Dallas: Promethean Press. .
 Bolelli, Daniele (2008). On the Warrior's Path. Blue Snake Books. . 
 Bowman, Paul (2013). Beyond Bruce Lee: Chasing the Dragon Through Film, Philosophy and Popular Culture. Wallflower Press. p. 1. .
 Campbell, Sid (2003). The Dragon and the Tiger: The Birth of Bruce Lee's Jeet Kune Do. Vol. 1 (illustrated ed.). Frog Books. .
 Campbell, Sid (2006). Remembering the master (illustrated ed.). Blue Snake Books. . 
Cheng, David (2004). Jeet Kune Do Basics. Tuttle Publishing. 
 Cardillo, Joseph (2003). Be Like Water: Practical Wisdom from the Martial Arts. Warner Books (NY). . 
 Clements, Jonathan (2017). A Brief History of the Martial Arts: East Asian Fighting Styles, from Kung Fu to Ninjutsu. London: Little, Brown Book Group. . 
 Clouse, Robert (1988). Bruce Lee: The Biography (illustrated ed.). Unique Publications. .
 Davis, Lamar (2001). Jun Fan/Jeet Kune Do: Scientific Streetfighting. HNL Publishing. . 
 Dennis, Felix (1974). Bruce Lee, King of Kung-Fu (illustrated ed.). Wildwood House. .
 Dorgan, Michael (1980). Bruce Lee's Toughest Fight. EBM Kung Fu Academy. 
 Fojón, Fernandez; Ivan E. (2017). Bruceploitation. Los clones de Bruce Lee. Applehead Team Creaciones. . 
 Gigliotti, Jim; Who HQ. (2014). Who Was Bruce Lee? New York: Penguin Putnam Inc. Illustrated by John Hinderliter.  . 
 Glover, Jesse R. (1976). Bruce Lee Between Win Chun and Jeet Kune Do. Unspecified vendor. .
 Gong, Tommy. (2014). Bruce Lee: The Evolution Of A Martial Artist. Black Belt Communications. . 
 Hochheim, Hoch (1995). The Maze of Jeet Kune Do, volume 33, issue 1. Rainbow Publications, Inc. 
 Home, Stewart (2018). Re-Enter The Dragon: Genre Theory, Brucesploitation & the Sleazy Joys of Lowbrow Cinema. Melbourne: Ledatape Organisation. . 
Kenny, Simon. (2009). Bruce Lee. Harpenden, Herts: Oldcastle Books Ltd. . 
 Kent, Chris (1989). Jun Fan Jeet Kune Do: The Textbook. Action Pursuit Group. . 
 Kerridge, Steve (2021). Unseen Bruce Lee — The Reg Smith Connection. On the Fly Productions Ltd. . 
 Kerridge, Steve (2022). Bruce Lee: The Intercepting Fist. On the Fly Productions Ltd. . 
 Lee, Bruce (1975). Tao of Jeet Kune Do (reprint ed.). Ohara Publications. .
 Lee, Bruce (1987). Chinese Gung Fu: The Philosophical Art Of Self-Defense. Paperback; Valencia, California, U.S.A.: Black Belt Communications. .  . 
 Lee, Bruce (2008). M. Uyehara (ed.). Bruce Lee's Fighting Method: The Complete Edition (illustrated ed.). Black Belt Communications. .
 Lee, Bruce (2009). Bruce Lee ― Wisdom for the Way. Black Belt Communications. .
 Lee, Linda (1975a). Bruce Lee: The Man Only I Knew. Warner Paperback Library. .
 Lee, Linda (1989). The Bruce Lee Story. United States: Ohara Publications. . 
 Lee, Shannon (2020). Be Water, My Friend: The True Teachings of Bruce Lee. London: Ebury Publishing. . 
 Little, John (1996). The Warrior Within — The philosophies of Bruce Lee to better understand the world around you and achieve a rewarding life (illustrated ed.). McGraw-Hill. .
 Little, John (1997). Bruce Lee: Letters of the Dragon: Correspondence, 1958-73. Charles E. Tuttle Co., Inc. p. 1. .
 Little, John (1997). Words of the Dragon: Interviews 1958–1973 (Bruce Lee). Tuttle Publishing. . 
 Little, John (1997). Jeet Kune Do: Bruce Lee's Commentaries on the Martial Way (illustrated ed.). Tuttle Publishing. . 
 Little, John (1997). The Tao of Gung Fu: A Study in The Way of Chinese Martial Art. Bruce Lee Library. Vol. 2 (illustrated ed.). Tuttle Publishing. . 
 Little, John (1998). Bruce Lee: The Art of Expressing the Human Body. Tuttle Publishing. . 
 Little, John (2000). Bruce Lee: The Celebrated Life of the Golden Dragon. Charles E. Tuttle Co., Inc. p. 1. .
 Little, John (2001). Bruce Lee: Artist of Life. Tuttle Publishing. .
 Little, John (2002). Striking Thoughts: Bruce Lee's Wisdom for Daily Living (illustrated ed.). Tuttle Publishing. . 
 Maeda, Daryl Joji (2022). Like Water: A Cultural History of Bruce Lee. NYU Press. .
 Mochizuki, Ken (2006). Be Water, My Friend: The Early Years of Bruce Lee. Illustrated by Dom Lee. Author's Note. New York: Lee & Low Books. .
 Polly, Matthew (2018). Bruce Lee: A Life. New York: Simon & Schuster. .
 Rafiq, Fiaz; Lee Inosanto, Diana (2020). Bruce Lee: The Life of a Legend. Birlinn. .
 Russo, Charles (2016). Striking Distance: Bruce Lee and the Dawn of Martial Arts in America. University of Nebraska Press. p. 1. .
 Seaman, Kevin (1999). Jun Fan Gung Fu Seeking The Path of Jeet Kune Do. Health 'N' Life. . 
 Sharif, Sulaiman (2009). 50 Martial Arts Myths. New media entertainment Ltd. . 
 Tackett, Tim; Bremer, Bob. (2008). Chinatown Jeet Kune Do: Essential Elements of Bruce Lee's Martial Art. Santa Clarita, CA: Black Belt Communications. . 
 Thomas, Bruce (1994). Bruce Lee: Fighting Spirit: a Biography. Berkeley, California: Frog, Ltd. .
 Thomas, Bruce (2006). Immortal Combat: Portrait of a True Warrior (illustrated ed.). Blue Snake Books. .
 Uyehara, Mitoshi (1993). Bruce Lee: the incomparable fighter (illustrated ed.). Black Belt Communications. .
 Vaughn, Jack (1986). The Legendary Bruce Lee. Black Belt Communications. .
 Vegara, Maria Isabel. (2019). Bruce Lee: Volume 29. Little People, Big Dreams (series of books). Illustrated by  Miguel Bustos. London:  Frances Lincoln Publishers Ltd. . 
 Yılmaz, Yüksel (2000). Dövüş Sanatlarının Temel İlkeleri. İstanbul, Turkey: Beyaz Yayınları. .
 Yılmaz, Yüksel (2008). Jeet Kune Do'nun Felsefesi. İstanbul, Turkey: Yalın Yayıncılık. .

See also
 Bruce Lee (comics)
 Bruce Lee filmography 
 Jeet Kune Do
 List of awards and honors received by Bruce Lee
 Bruceploitation

References

Jeet Kune Do
Books by Bruce Lee